Eagle Lake is a lake in Carlton County, Minnesota, in the United States.

Eagle Lake was named for the bald eagle native to the region.

See also
List of lakes in Minnesota

References

Lakes of Minnesota
Lakes of Carlton County, Minnesota